The 2006 Topic International Darts League was a darts tournament held in The Hague, Netherlands. The tournament was sponsored by Topic, a Dutch-based electronics software and hardware manufacturer.

It began as a tournament for BDO players but Dutch broadcaster SBS-6 invited five PDC/non-WDF players for the first time in this event, with Raymond van Barneveld's switch to the PDC earlier in the year being the vital part in that decision.

Results

Preliminary round
  Andy Fordham 5–4  Roy Montgomery

First round
"ROUND ROBIN" BEST OF 11 LEGS. BEST TWO IN EACH GROUP GO FORWARD TO "ROUND ROBIN" ROUND TWO

Second round
ROUND TWO "ROUND ROBIN" BEST OF 13 LEGS. BEST TWO IN EACH GROUP GO FORWARD TO QUARTERFinals

Knockout stages

References

International Darts League, 2006
International Darts League
2006 in Dutch sport